Talik is a layer of year-round unfrozen ground that lies in permafrost areas.

Talik may also refer to:
 A nickname of Israel Tal, Israeli general
 Tâlik, Turkish simplification of the Nastaʿlīq script
 Taʿlīq script